George L. San Jose is the Founder and Chief Creative Officer of the multicultural marketing and advertising agency, The San Jose Group, public relations company SJ Public Relations and international marketing company, San Jose Consulting.

Advertising and marketing career 
He began his professional career three decades ago as an account planner for DMB&B's Spanish Advertising and Marketing Services (SAMS) – a multicultural advertising agency in New York City. He was appointed general manager & executive creative director in 1980.

After working for SAMS for two years, in 1981 he founded The San Jose Group in Chicago, a marketing and advertising agency that specializes in the US Hispanic market. In 2009, Advertising Age ranked The San Jose Group 19th out of the 50 top Hispanic ad agencies.

In 1996, San Jose co-founded the Association of Hispanic Advertising Agencies (AHAA) and has served the association as both director and treasurer.

Entrepreneurship 
A member of The San Jose Network Ltd., SJ Public Relations, was created in 1990. It specializes in crisis and issues management, consumer marketing, health care, and multicultural communications. SJ Public Relations has worked with a number of clients including: Chicago and Gift of Hope Organ & Tissue Network, among others.

Appointments 
San Jose sits on the board of the Hispanic Christian Churches Association, CAMCO and the U.S. Selective Service System as the Chairman for the U.S. Board of Appeals. He is also a member of Depaul University Deans Advisory Council and has served on the boards of the Association of Hispanic Advertising Agencies and the Economic Club of Chicago.

Honors 

San Jose was recognized by the Advertising Federation of Greater Miami in 1993 for his lectures at Advertising Age Seminars and the Se Habla Espanol Annual Conference as well as his creative work for Anheuser-Busch.

Crain's Chicago business has named San Jose to its "Who's Who in Chicago Business list" multiple times from 1990 to 2015.

In 1997, Advertising Age recognized San Jose on its "People On A Roll" list.

Bibliography 

San Jose, George L. (1994). "Hispanic Marketing Attracts New Customers." Illinois Banker. Volume 79, issue 3.  
San Jose, George L. (5 December 2008). "Haciendo de la mercadotecnia un costo fijo para tu negocio." (Making marketing a fixed cost for your business) Negocios Now.  
San Jose, George L. (2009). "Mercadotecnia inteligente hoy, para un fuerte mañana." (Smart Marketing today for a stronger tomorrow) Negocios Now.  
San Jose, George L. (2012). "Advice from the Pros: Five Writing Tips from George L. San Jose." The Copywriter's Toolkit: The Complete Guide to Strategic Advertising. Ed. Berman, Margo. Wiley-Blackwell, Massachusetts.

References 

Living people
American advertising executives
Cuban emigrants to the United States
Year of birth missing (living people)